Milton Bagby is an Audie Award-winning American voice actor and author who has recorded over 170 audiobooks and dozens of short stories, narratives and commercials.

A veteran voice over talent in radio and television commercials, Bagby produced his first ACX title, "Organizational Culture and Leadership" for Audible’s ACX system in 2011.  He has also produced a number of titles for Radio Archives, a distributor of old time radio programs and pulp fiction reprints.

In addition to producing and recording audiobooks, Bagby has written or co-written five novels and a stage play, all published with Amazon through KDP/Createspace.

A native of Alabama, Bagby has lived in Nashville, Tennessee, for over 20 years.

Audiobooks

Non-Fiction

General Fiction

The Secret Agent X Series

The Operator #5 Series

The Captain Future Series

Educational/Explainer

Works Written by Milton Bagby

List of all works by Milton Bagby

References

Living people
American male voice actors
Writers from Birmingham, Alabama
Male actors from Birmingham, Alabama
Year of birth missing (living people)